The 1979–80 season was Blackpool F.C.'s 72nd season (69th consecutive) in the Football League. They competed in the 24-team Division Three, then the third tier of English football, finishing eighteenth.

Stan Ternent succeeded Bob Stokoe as manager prior to the start of the season; however, he too was replaced during the campaign itself, by former player Alan Ball.

Stan McEwan was the club's top scorer, with fourteen goals (twelve in the league, one in the FA Cup and one in the League Cup). Tony Kellow was the joint-top scorer in the league.

Table

References

Blackpool F.C.
Blackpool F.C. seasons